is a Japanese former competitive figure skater. She is the 2010 Asian Trophy champion and competed at three ISU Junior Grand Prix events.

Programs

Competitive highlights
JGP: Junior Grand Prix

References 

CHUKYO television
Tokai television
2005–2006 Japanese National Novice

External links
 
 Ayane Nakamura at Tracings.net

1993 births
Japanese female single skaters
Living people
Sportspeople from Sendai